John Gaspard Gubbins (6 January 1877 Upham, Hampshire - 12 November 1935 Johannesburg) was an Africana collector and writer. He was the son of a rector Richard Shard Gubbins (1 December 1826 St. Marylebone, London - 23 October 1884 Herne Hill, London) and Ellen Rolls (30 August 1845 Monmouthshire, Wales 1902 Kensington, London) who were married on 21 November 1865. 

Gubbins was educated at Haileybury and Clare College at Cambridge. He came to Transvaal Colony in 1902 and started farming near Ottoshoop on a farm he called Malemani aka Malmani after the original seTswana name of the area, "Molemane", which means "place of much water". Fluorspar was discovered on his farm.

Gubbins spent his life assembling Africana in the form of old books, pictures and manuscripts. A disastrous fire on Christmas Eve 1931 at the Witwatersrand University destroyed 35,000 books, and half of Gubbins' Africana collection. Fearing for the safety of his collection on the farm due to grassfires, Gubbins had started with its relocating to Johannesburg. Undeterred, Gubbins and his patrons immediately started on a new collection which eventually became the Gubbins Library and the nucleus of Johannesburg's Africana Museum. He was director of this Museum until his death. The University conferred an honorary D.Litt. on him.

Works
Raven's fire: a novel by John Gaspard Gubbins (2013)
Profound river - John Gaspard Gubbins (2011)
Three-dimensional thinking - John Gaspard Gubbins (1924)

References

External links
John Gaspard Gubbins Papers 1877-1981
"A Place That Matters Yet: John Gubbins's MuseumAfrica in the Postcolonial World" - Sara Byala
"Two Worlds Collide: John Gaspard Gubbins in South Africa, 1902–1924" - Sara Byala
 John Gaspard Gubbins, South Africa's North-West Province - A Guide to its History and Heritage

Museum founders
South African male novelists
1877 births
1935 deaths
South African non-fiction writers
Male non-fiction writers
British emigrants to Transvaal Colony